Korea Baduk High School is a public high school located in Suncheon, South Jeolla Province, South Korea that has a specialised Baduk programme for its students.

History
Korea Baduk High School was founded on March 9, 1972, under the name Jooam High School (주암종합고등학교). The current principal Kim Jong-gu was appointed on March 1, 2014, as the school's 16th principal. As of 10 February 2015, there are a total of 5,076 graduates.

References

External links
 Official website 

High schools in South Korea
Schools in South Jeolla Province
Suncheon
Educational institutions established in 1972